Breeden Creek is a stream in western Douglas County in the Ozarks of south central Missouri. The stream is a tributary to Little Beaver Creek.

The headwaters are on the south flank of Keyger Mountain which rises to a peak elevation of over 1660 feet just one-half mile from source. The stream confluence lies approximately one quarter mile northwest of the community of Pansy at the end of Missouri Route NN.

The stream along with the old Breeden School that was adjacent to it bears the name of a local family in the area.

References

Rivers of Douglas County, Missouri